Cynthia "Cindy" Gastelle (September 4, 1961 –  April 1980) was a formerly unidentified American murder victim who disappeared on April 3, 1980. Her body was found two years later, but remained unidentified for 30 years before matching of mitochondrial DNA entered into the national DNA database provided her identity.

Circumstances 
Cynthia Gastelle, a recent high school graduate, was last seen heading to a job interview at a deli in Takoma Park, Maryland. She had left home around 10:30 and had boarded a Ride On bus to Silver Spring, according to her brother Peter Gastelle. Though Cynthia Gastelle was supposed to go to two job interviews, she only arrived at one of them. Gastelle never returned home that day. She had run away twice before, and had also attempted unsuccessfully to change her identity, so her family waited a few days before reporting her missing. However, her family gave no indication that she was currently in trouble at the time of her disappearance.

At the time, forensic technology was not advanced enough for investigators to determine how the unidentified remains had gotten there or if it was a homicide. However, the case is now being investigated as a homicide after recent examinations revealed the decedent had sustained injuries consistent with stabbing. Apparently, the skeleton had clothing on it which could have been recognized by Gastelle's family. However, the Prince William County Police Department was unaware that Gastelle was missing, so they never contacted the Takoma Park Police Department. The remains eventually became a Jane Doe.

Identification 
Over the years, Gastelle's father would be called to examine remains and visit morgues according to her brother Greg Gastelle. Gastelle would eventually be added to NamUs and the Doe Network, however neither her dental X-rays or DNA was included on both sites which made comparisons between her and unidentified decedents challenging. In 2001, DNA evidence from the Jane Doe was entered into the national DNA database. In 2011, DNA samples from Gastelle's family were collected from an unrelated case elsewhere. That same year, a user on Websleuths noted that Gastelle was not on NamUs's exclusion list for the Jane Doe. The Takoma Park police were contacted in February 2011 to make a comparison between her and Jane Doe which was initiated that July. It was revealed in June 2012 that a match had been made via mitochondrial DNA. Gastelle's identification was preceded by the death of her mother Mary in 1993 and father Terence in 2001.

Following Gastelle's identification, the investigation is now focused on finding Gastelle's killer. Detectives have stated an aim to speak to Gastelle's boyfriend at the time, whose first name is Micheal, nicknamed "Mike", but have made it clear that he is not considered a suspect. As of 2012, detectives were unable to locate Micheal. Investigators are also looking to understand how Gastelle's remains ended up in Virginia, as she was not known to have any ties to Prince William County. It is believed that Gastelle, who could not drive, did not go there of her own volition, but was instead driven there by someone else. It has not been stated whether this likely occurred before or after her death.

See also 
List of solved missing persons cases

References 

1980 in Virginia
1980 murders in the United States
1982 in Virginia
April 1980 events in the United States
Deaths by person in Virginia
Deaths by stabbing in the United States
Formerly missing people
Incidents of violence against women
Missing person cases in Virginia
Unsolved murders in the United States
History of women in Virginia